Fanático is a Spanish comedy drama streaming television series created and written by Yago de Torres, Federico Maniá Sibona and Dani del Águila for Netflix. It was released on 29 July 2022.

Cast and characters
 Lorenzo Ferro as Lázaro / Quimera Salva
 Dollar Selmouni as Pompa
 Carlota Urdiales as Mia
  as Héctor
 Eva Almeida as Clara

Episodes

References

External links
 
 

2020s comedy-drama television series
2020s Spanish comedy television series
2020s Spanish drama television series
2022 Spanish television series debuts
Spanish-language Netflix original programming